Soop, also known as Sop or Tsiof, is an island in Southwest Papua province of Indonesia, located in the north of Sele Strait, and off the northwestern coast of the Bird's Head Peninsula.

There is a settlement covering the north and east coasts of the island. It has a population of 1,378 (according to the official estimate for mid 2021) and constitutes a kelurahan within the district of Sorong Islands within the City of Sorong. Outside the settlement, and apart from a small mangrove patch in the southeast, the island is covered by shrub and savannah-type vegetation.

Bibliography 
 

 Penutupan Lahan 2011 (available at WebGIS Kehutanan), a land cover dataset

Sorong
Islands of Western New Guinea